Ayoade Olatunbosun-Alakija is Nigeria's former chief humanitarian coordinator and is an activist for social justice. She has been advocating that women leaders be assertive in overcoming resistance to be included in leading conversations. She was one of the speakers at the 2018 Women Leaders in Global Health Conference.

References 

Nigerian women activists
21st-century Nigerian medical doctors